Omar Zarif (born 9 February 1978) is an Argentine professional football manager and former player, who is the current assistant manager of Greek Super League club AEK Athens.

Playing career
Zarif started his playing career in 1998 with Dock Sud in the regionalised 4th division. The club were relegated and Zarif continued playing for them in the regionalised 5th division.

In 2002, he was signed by El Porvenir of the National 2nd division, he then had spells with other 2nd division teams; Los Andes, Defensa y Justicia and Nueva Chicago. In 2006, he was part of the Nueva Chicago team that won promotion to the Argentine Primera. The club was relegated at the end of the 2006–2007 season, but Zarif was signed by newly promoted Huracán keeping his place in the top division of Argentine football.

For the 2008–09 season Zarif signed for Rosario Central, and in 2009 he joined newly promoted Chacarita Juniors. For the 2010–11 season, Zarif returned to Rosario Central, this time to play in the second division.

Managerial career
Zarif played under Matias Almeyda at Banfield, helping the club earn promotion to Argentina’s top league during the 2013–14 season. Midway through Banfield’s 2015 season, he switched from playing to coaching and remained on Almeyda's staff when Almeyda became manager of Chivas later in the year. Omar Zarif joined San Jose as an assistant coach under Almeyda ahead of the 2019 MLS season.

References

External links
 Argentine Primera statistics
 Football-Lineups player profile

1978 births
Living people
Sportspeople from Avellaneda
Argentine people of Arab descent
Argentine footballers
Association football midfielders
Club Atlético Los Andes footballers
Defensa y Justicia footballers
Nueva Chicago footballers
Club Atlético Huracán footballers
Rosario Central footballers
Chacarita Juniors footballers
Club Atlético Banfield footballers
Argentine Primera División players
San Jose Earthquakes non-playing staff